Scotus Academy was a Catholic all-boys day school on Corstorphine Road in Edinburgh, Scotland. It was founded in 1953 by the Congregation of Christian Brothers and closed in 1978. The building now forms part of Murrayfield Hospital.

Rectors 
 Br. J. Solano Russell, CFC (1953 – February 1959)
 Br. Patrick Kostka Ennis, CFC (April 1959 – 1962)
 Br. Ignatius Baylor, CFC (1962 – February 1966)
 Br. J. C. Ambrose, CFC (April 1966 – 1971)
 Br. T. Livingstone, CFC (1971 – 1978)

Notable faculty 
Arthur Oldham, an English composer, was amongst its faculty.

References

External links
www.scotusacademy.net website dedicated to former pupils and staff

Defunct Catholic secondary schools in Scotland
Defunct boys' schools in Scotland
Defunct secondary schools in Edinburgh
History of Edinburgh
Educational institutions established in 1953
Educational institutions disestablished in 1977
1953 establishments in Scotland
1977 disestablishments in Scotland
Defunct Catholic primary schools in Scotland
Defunct private schools in Edinburgh